Madison Doar (born 29 June 1999) is a New Zealand field hockey player for the New Zealand national team.

She participated at the 2018 Women's Hockey World Cup.

References

1999 births
Living people
New Zealand female field hockey players
Female field hockey forwards
Field hockey players from Whangārei
Field hockey players at the 2018 Commonwealth Games
Commonwealth Games medallists in field hockey
Commonwealth Games gold medallists for New Zealand
21st-century New Zealand women
Medallists at the 2018 Commonwealth Games